Tripura Sundari (Sanskrit: त्रिपुरा सुन्दरी, IAST: Tripura Sundarī), also known as Rajarajeshwari, Shodashi, Kamakshi, and Lalita is a Hindu goddess, worshipped as a principal aspect of supreme goddess Mahadevi mainly venerated in Shaktism, the goddess-oriented sect of Hinduism. She is also one of the ten Mahavidyas. She is praised in many Shakta texts, with Lalita Sahasranama, Soundarya Lahari being the most popular one. She is known as Adi Parashakti in Lalitopakhyana of Brahmanda Purana.

According to the Srikula tradition in Shaktism, Tripura Sundari is the foremost of the Mahavidyas, the supreme divinity of Hinduism and also the primary goddess of Sri Vidya. The Tripura Upanishad places her as the ultimate Shakti (energy, power) of the universe. She is described as the supreme consciousness, ruling from above Brahma, Vishnu, and Shiva.

Etymology and nomenclature 
The word Tripura (त्रिपुर ) means three cities or three worlds, Sundari (सुन्दरी) means beautiful woman. Tripura Sundari means the most beautiful woman in the three worlds. She is called Tripura because it is similar to the triangle (triangle) that symbolizes the yoni and forms her circle. She is also known as Tripura as her mantra has three clusters of letters. She is called Tripura because she is manifested in Brahma, Vishnu and Shiva as the creator, preserver and destroyer of the universe.

History and paramparas
The Srikula (family of Sri) tradition (sampradaya) focuses worship on Devi in the form of the goddess Lalita-Tripura Sundari. Rooted in first-millennium. Srikula became a force in South India no later than the seventh century, and is today the prevalent form of Shaktism practiced in South Indian regions such as Kerala, Tamil Nadu and Tamil areas of Sri Lanka.

The Srikula's best-known school is Srividya, "one of Shakta Tantrism's most influential and theologically sophisticated movements." Its central symbol, the Sri Chakra, is probably the most famous visual image in all of Hindu Tantric tradition. Its literature and practice is perhaps more systematic than that of any other Shakta sect.

Srividya largely views the goddess as "benign [saumya] and beautiful [saundarya]" (in contrast to Kalikula's focus on "terrifying [ugra] and horrifying [ghora]" Goddess forms such as Kali or Durga). In Srikula practice, moreover, every aspect of the goddess – whether malignant or gentle – is identified with Lalita.

Srikula adepts most often worship Lalita using the abstract Sri Chakra yantra, which is regarded as her subtle form. The Sri Chakra can be visually rendered either as a two-dimensional diagram (whether drawn temporarily as part of the worship ritual, or permanently engraved in metal) or in the three-dimensional, pyramidal form known as the Sri Meru. It is not uncommon to find a Sri Chakra or Sri Meru installed in South Indian temples, because – as modern practitioners assert – "there is no disputing that this is the highest form of Devi and that some of the practice can be done openly. But what you see in the temples is not the srichakra worship you see when it is done privately."

The Srividya paramparas can be further broadly subdivided into two streams, the Kaula (a vamamarga practice) and the Samaya (a dakshinamarga practice). The Kaula or Kaulachara, first appeared as a coherent ritual system in the 8th century in central India, and its most revered theorist is the 18th-century philosopher Bhaskararaya, widely considered "the best exponent of Shakta philosophy."

The Samaya or Samayacharya finds its roots in the work of the 16th-century commentator Lakshmidhara, and is "fiercely puritanical [in its] attempts to reform Tantric practice in ways that bring it in line with high-caste brahmanical norms." Many Samaya practitioners explicitly deny being either Shakta or Tantric, though scholars argues that their cult remains technically both. The Samaya-Kaula division marks "an old dispute within Hindu Tantrism."

Legend 

The battle between Goddess Lalita Tripura Sundari and Bhandasura is described in the Lalitopakhyana of Brahmanda Purana and Jnana Khanda of Tripura Rahasya. Lord Shiva married Sati, the daughter of the king Daksha. Sati's father did not invite Shiva to a great sacrifice as Daksha and Shiva were dissatisfied with each other. Sati, however, went to attend the ceremony despite Shiva's opposition. Daksha insulted Lord Shiva in front of Sati and she jumped into the fire to end his humiliation and committed suicide. As a result, Shiva beheaded Daksha, but when Shiva's anger subsided, he revived him with a goat's head. Adi Parasakti was also reborn as Parvati as a result of a favor bestowed on King Himavan, and Tarakasura, an enemy of the gods, was privileged to make his death possible only for the son of Shiva and Shakti. Due to this, the gods sought the help of Kama, the Hindu deity of love to unite Shiva and Parvati. Manmata aimed his flower arrows at Shiva and Parvati to make them feel loved. Angered by this, Shiva turned Kama into ashes with his third eye. Sometime later, at the request of his son Ganesha, Shiva gave birth to an asura named Bhandasura from the ashes of Kama. When the gods could not bear the persecution of Bhandasura that befell them, they sought the help of the Nirguna Brahman on the instructions of the Trinity. They prepared a great yajna for the sake of welfare of the creation and sacrificed the whole universe as libation. Then from fire, Brahman emerged in the form of Maha Tripura Sundari Devi. She split up her form as Kameshwara and Kameshwari and recreated the universe. Later, Goddess Tripura Sundari formed her army, killed Bhandasura and returned to Manidvipa.

Role in creation 
According to the Tripura Rahasya, only goddess Tripura Sundari existed before the beginning of the universe. She created the Trimurti and began the creation of the universe.

Literature 
The most important text of Tripura Sundari is the Lalita Sahasranama (from the Brahmanda Purana). Tripura Sundari is most often mentioned in the Lalitopakhyana (the fourth book of the Brahmanda Purana) and Tripura Rahasya. The Lalitopakhyana tells of the epic battle between her forces and the forces of the arch-demon Bhandasura. 

The Tripura Upanishad places the goddess Tripura Sundari as the ultimate Shakti (energy, power) of the universe. She is described as the supreme consciousness, above Brahma, Vishnu and Shiva.  The Tripura Upanishad is historically the most complete introduction to Shakta Tantrism, distilling into its 16 verses almost every important topic in Shakta Tantra tradition. Along with the Tripura Upanishad, the Tripuratapini Upanishad has attracted scholarly bhasya (commentary) in the second half of 2nd-millennium, such as the work of  Bhaskararaya, and  Ramanand. 

The Bahvricha Upanishad is notable for asserting that the Self (soul, Atman) is a Goddess who alone existed before the creation of the universe.

According to the "Patala Khanda" of Padma Purana and the Narada Purana, God Krishna is the male form of the goddess Lalita.

Lalita Sahasranama 
Lalita Sahasranama contains a thousand names of the Hindu mother goddess Lalita. The names are organized in a hymn (stotras). It is the only sahasranama that does not repeat a single name. Further, in order to maintain the meter, other sahasranamas use the artifice of adding suffixes like tu, api, ca, and hi, which are conjunctions that do not necessarily add to the meaning of the name except in cases of interpretation. The Lalita sahasranama does not use any such auxiliary conjunctions and is unique in being an enumeration of holy names that meet the metrical, poetical and mystic requirements of a sahasranama by their order throughout the text.

Lalita Sahasranama begins by calling the goddess Shri Mata (the great mother), Shri Maharajni (the great queen) and Shrimat Simhasaneshwari (the queen sitting on the lion-throne). In verses 2 and 3 of the Sahasranama she is described as a Udayatbhanu Sahasrabha (the one who is as bright as the rays of thousand rising suns), Chaturbahu Samanvita (the one who has four hands) and Ragasvarupa Pashadhya (the one who is holding the rope). Chidagnikunda Sambhuta (one who was born from the altar of the fire of consciousness) and Devakarya samudyata (one who manifested Herself for fulfilling the objects of the devas) are among other names mentioned in the sahasranama.

Composition 
The Lalita Sahasranama is said to have been composed by the eight vaag devis (Vasini, Kameshvari, Aruna, Vimala, Jayani, Modini, Sarveshvari, and Kaulini) upon the command of the goddess Lalita herself. The Sahasranama says that "One can worship Lalita only if she wishes us to do so." This stotra occurs in the Brahmanda Purana (history of the universe) in the chapter of discussion between Hayagriva and Sage Agastya in Kanchipuram. Hayagriva is an incarnation of Vishnu with the head of a horse and is held to be the storehouse of knowledge. Agastya is one of the sages of yore and one of the stars of the constellation Saptarishi. At the request of Agastya, Hayagriva is said to have taught him the thousand holiest names of Lalita. The temple at Thirumeyachur, near Kumbakonam, is said to be where Agastya was initiated into this sahasranama. An alternative origin is that the Upanishad Bramham Mutt at Kanchipuram is where this initiation happened.

Tripura Rahasya
Tripura Sundari occupies a very special place in the Tripura Rahasya, a Shakta scripture.

Iconography 
Her form is described in her Dhyana Stotra as follows.

I imagine of my goddess Bhavani, who has a color of the rising sun. Who has eyes which are waves of mercy, who has bow made of sweet cane, arrows made of soft flowers, and Aasha, Ankusha in her hands, and who is surrounded, by her devotees with powers great, as personification of the concept of “I”. 

Also details of her appearance are found in the famous hymn in her praise, the Lalita Sahasranama, where she is said to be,

She is often depicted iconographically as a 16-year-old girl (hence the appellation "Shodashi") seated on a lotus that rests on the supine body of Sadashiva, which in turn lies on a throne whose legs are the gods Brahma, Vishnu, Isvara, and Rudra. In some cases, the lotus is growing out of Shiva's navel. In other more common cases, the lotus is grown directly from the Sri Chakra.

In the Jnana Khanda of Tripura Rahasya, goddess herself describes her eternal form.

The Vamakeshvara tantra says that Tripura-sundari dwells on the peaks of the Himalayas; is worshipped by sages and heavenly nymphs; has a body like pure crystal; wears a tiger skin, a snake as a garland around her neck, and her hair tied in a jata; holds a trident and drum; is decorated with jewels, flowers, and ashes; and has a large bull as a vehicle.

The Saundarya Lahari and the Tantrasara describe her in detail from her hair to her feet. The Tantrasara dhyana mantra says that she is illuminated by the jewels of the crowns of Brahma and Visnu, which fell at her feet when they bowed down to worship her. Kinsley also says that "In Saundarya Lahari and Tantrasara she is not associated with Shiva in any obvious way as she is in other depictions".

Vaishnavism traditions have a similar set of complementary parallels between Vishnu and Lakshmi. The Tantric Vaishnava Pancharatra texts associates Lalita with Lakshmi. Author Douglas Renfrew Brooks says, "Lalita, like the Pancharatra conception of Lakshmi, acts independently by taking over the cosmic functions of the male deity; yet she does not defy the god's wishes". Brooks also says, "In contrast to most Vaishnava conceptions of Lakshmi, however, Lalita destabilizes temporarily for the purpose of reasserting order".

Scholar and professor Thomas B. Coburn says,

Sri Yantra 

In the Shri Vidya school of Hindu tantra, the Sri Yantra ("sacred instrument"), also Sri Chakra is a diagram formed by nine interlocking triangles that surround and radiate out from the central (bindu) point.
It represents the goddess in her form of Shri Lalita Or Tripura Sundari, "the beauty of the three worlds (earth, atmosphere and sky(heaven)"(Bhoo, Bhuva and Swa).

The worship of the Sri Yantra is central to the Shri Vidya system of Hindu worship. Four isosceles triangles with the apices upwards, representing Shiva or the Masculine. Five isosceles triangles with the apices downward, symbolizing female embodiment Shakti. Thus, the Sri Yantra also represents the union of Masculine and Feminine Divine. Because it is composed of nine triangles, it is known as the Navayoni Chakra. "These nine triangles are of various sizes and intersect with one another. In the middle is the power point (bindu), visualizing the highest, the invisible, elusive centre from which the entire figure and the cosmos expand. The triangles are enclosed by two rows of (8 and 16) petals, representing the lotus of creation and reproductive vital force. The broken lines of the outer frame denote the figure to be a sanctuary with four openings to the regions of the universe".

In a recent issue of Brahmavidya, the journal of the Adyar Library, Subhash Kak argues that the description of Sri Yantra is identical to the yantra described in the Śvetāśvatara Upanisad.

Together the nine triangles are interlaced in such a way as to form 43 smaller triangles in a web symbolic of the entire cosmos or a womb symbolic of creation. Together they express Advaita or non-duality. This is surrounded by a lotus of eight petals, a lotus of sixteen petals, and an earth square resembling a temple with four doors.

The Sri Yantra is also known as the nava chakra because it can also be seen as having nine levels. "Nine" comes from" Nava" of Sanskrit. Each level corresponds to a mudra, a yogini, and a specific form of the Deity Tripura Sundari along with her mantra. These levels starting from the outside or bottom layer are:
Trailokya Mohana or Bhupara, a square of three lines with four portals
Sarva Aasa Paripuraka, a sixteen-petal lotus
Sarva Sankshobahana, an eight-petal lotus
Sarva Saubhagyadayaka, composed of fourteen small triangles
Sara Arthasadhaka, composed of ten small triangles
Sarva Rakshakara, composed of ten small triangles
Sarva Rogahara, composed of eight small triangles
Sarva Siddhiprada, composed of 1 small triangle
Sarva Anandamaya, composed of a point or bindu

The Sri Yantra is the symbol of Hindu tantra, which is based on the Hindu philosophy of Kashmir Shaivism. The Sri Yantra is the object of devotion in Shri Vidya.

The two-dimensional Sri Chakra, when it is projected into three dimensions is called a Maha Meru (Mount Meru).

Temples

India 
The most important temple of Tripura Sundari is the Kanchi Kamakshi temple in Kanchipuram, Tamil Nadu. 

Tripura Sundari Temple in Udaipur, about 55 km from Agartala, Tripura, is located on top of the hills near Radhakishorepur village. It is one of the 51 Shakti Pithas. 

A temple of Tripura Sundari temple is in Chhatrabhog (Saturbhog). It is situated in south 24 Pgs under Diamond Harbour Subdivision West Bengal. The nearest railway station is Mathurapur Road in Sealdah South section. From the source of Rajratnakar descendants of Drajhu king, Kalinda made a wooden Tripura Sundari icon at this place. 

Sri Kanchi Kamakoti Peetam, also called the Sri Kanchi Matham or the Sri Kanchi Monastery, is a Hindu institution, located in Kanchipuram, Tamil Nadu. It is located near a temple dedicated to Goddess Sri Kamakshi, along with a shrine for the Advaita Vedanta teacher Adi Shankara.

Germany 

In Hamm in North Rhine-Westphalia, Germany, there is the Sri Kamadchi Ampal Temple, built 2002.

Festivals

Lalita Jayanti 
Lalita Jayanthi is celebrated on Magha Purnima, the full moon day of the month of Magha (January-February). It is a very important day in some parts of North India when special offerings and ceremonies are held. It is believed that devotees on this day will be blessed if they worship Goddess Lalita with full devotion and dedication.

Lalita Panchami 
Lalita Panchami is a very auspicious tithi, celebrated on the fifth day of the Sharad Navaratri festival. Legend has it that on this auspicious day Goddess Lalita emerged from fire to defeat Bhandasura, a demon created from the ashes of Kamadeva. This day is very important in Gujarat and Maharashtra. On this day, some devotees also hold a fast called Lalita Panchami vrata. It is believed to bring wealth, happiness and wisdom. Chanting of Vedic mantras dedicated to Goddess Lalita on this day is very useful. It is a popular belief that doing so will immediately solve all the personal as well as business related problems in life.

See also

References

Notes

Citations

Works cited

Further reading

External links

 
Lakshmi
Forms of Parvati
Mahavidyas
Shaktism
Hindu tantric deities
Consorts of Shiva